Schistura macrotaenia is a species of ray-finned fish, a stone loach, in the genus Schistura. It occurs in the Tengtiao Jiang River drainage in Yunnan and may also occur in the same river drainage in northern Vietnam.

References 

M
Fish described in 1990